Paul Apreku Twum-Barimah is a Ghanaian politician and member of parliament for the Dormaa East constituency in the Bono region of Ghana.

Early life and education 
Paul was born on 23 May 1982 and hails from Kobedia-Asupra in the Bono region of Ghana. He had his SSSCE in 2000. He had his bachelor's degree in Sociology & Information Studies in Social Science in 2006. He further had his MSc in Communications and Public Affairs in 2012. He had his LLB in General Law in 2018. He also had his certificate in Oil, Gas & Petroleum Management in 2020.

Career 
Paul was the Head of Event and Production at Radio Universe. He was also the Station Manager at RGU radio. He was the Media mechanical and engineering manager at EXP Ghana. He was also the Assistant Communication Officer at the British High Commission. He was also the Corporate Affairs and Sustainability Manager for Zen Petroleum. He was also the Development Communication Coordinator for SADA. He was also at the Government Relations and Regulatory Affairs for ENI Ghana Exploration & Production Limited.

Political career 
He is a member of NPP and currently the MP for Dormaa East Constituency. He won the parliamentary seat with 16,679 votes whilst the NDC aspirant Racheal Owusuah had 11,383 votes.

Committees 
He is a member of the Special Budget Committee, a member of the Foreign Affairs Committee and also a member of the Poverty Reduction Strategy Committee.

Personal life 
Paul is a Christian.

Philanthropy 
In December 2021, he donated food and other assorted items to about 200 widows in the Dormaa East constituency. He also gave hospital beds and medical equipment to the Wamfie District Hospital. He also donated working equipment and tools to about 400 apprentices and workers in Wamanafo and Wamfie.

References 

Living people
Ghanaian MPs 2021–2025
New Patriotic Party politicians
1982 births